David Nikitich Kugultinov (13 March 1922 – 17 June 2006) was a Soviet and Kalmyk whose acclaim and prominence made him a recipient of numerous honors and awards, including the title, "National Poet of the Republic of Kalmykia."

A minor planet 2296 Kugultinov discovered in 1975 by Soviet astronomer Lyudmila Chernykh is named after him.

References

1922 births
2006 deaths
20th-century Russian male writers
20th-century Russian poets
21st-century Russian male writers
21st-century Russian poets
People from Yashaltinsky District
Maxim Gorky Literature Institute alumni
Eleventh convocation members of the Supreme Soviet of the Soviet Union
Heroes of Socialist Labour
Recipients of the Order "For Merit to the Fatherland", 3rd class
Recipients of the Order of Friendship of Peoples
Recipients of the Order of Lenin
Recipients of the Order of the Red Banner of Labour
Recipients of the USSR State Prize
Kalmyk people

Norillag detainees
Socialist realism writers
Russian male poets
Russian male writers
Soviet male poets
Soviet male writers